Mangalyam Tantunanena is a 1998 Indian Kannada language romantic drama film directed by V. S. Reddy and produced by Allu Aravind. The film stars Ravichandran along with Ramya Krishna and S. P. Balasubrahmanyam among others.

The film is the Kannada remake of the 1996 Telugu film Pavitra Bandham and was also remade in Tamil as Priyamanavale and in Hindi as Hum Apke Dil Me Rahte Hain.

Cast 

 Ravichandran as Vijay
 Ramya Krishna as Radha
 S. P. Balasubrahmanyam as Vishwanath, Vijay's father 
 Sumithra
 Bhavyashri Rai
 Sadashiva Brahmavar as Ramaiah
 Mandya Ramesh
 Rekha Das
 Sanketh Kashi
 Ravi Babu
 Vijay Kashi
 K. S. Chitra as herself (special appearance)

Soundtrack 
The music was composed by V. Manohar and lyrics for the soundtrack penned by K. Kalyan.

References 

1998 films
1990s Kannada-language films
Indian romantic drama films
Kannada remakes of Telugu films
Geetha Arts films
Films scored by V. Manohar
1998 romantic drama films